Rice Lake is a lake in Cook County, Minnesota.

Topography
Rice lake lies in the Poplar River watershed, receiving inflow from Crescent Lake in the north, and outflowing into the main branch of the Poplar River. Rice Lake has an area of 222.52 acres and a maximum depth of ten feet. 182 acres are in the littoral zone, and the water is clear down five feet. It lies 1737 feet above sea level.

References

Lakes of Cook County, Minnesota
Lakes of Minnesota